Morgan-Skinner-Boyd Homestead, also known as Walnut Grove, is a historic home located at Merrillville, Lake County, Indiana.  The original section of the house was built in 1877, and is a two-story, Italianate style brick dwelling with a low pitched roof topped by a cupola.  A kitchen addition was added about 1900, along with a one-story, wood-frame addition.  The house features porches with Eastlake movement decoration. Also on the property are the contributing pump house (c. 1877), milk shed (c. 1900), and granary (c. 1877).

It was listed in the National Register of Historic Places in 2010.

References

Houses on the National Register of Historic Places in Indiana
Italianate architecture in Indiana
Houses completed in 1877
Buildings and structures in Lake County, Indiana
National Register of Historic Places in Lake County, Indiana
1877 establishments in Indiana